Curtis Grant Jr. (born December 28, 1992) is an American football linebacker who is currently a free agent. He played college football at Ohio State.

Early years
A native of Richmond, Virginia, Grant attended Hermitage High School, where he was rated the No. 1 inside linebackers prospect by Rivals.com. He chose Ohio State over UNC, Florida, and Virginia.

Professional career

San Diego Chargers
On May 2, 2015, Grant was signed by the San Diego Chargers as an undrafted free agent. On August 30, 2015, he was waived.

Atlanta Falcons
On December 15, 2015, Grant was signed to the Atlanta Falcons' practice squad.

Tennessee Titans
On April 1, 2016 Grant was signed by the Tennessee Titans. On September 2, 2016, he was released by the Titans as part of final roster cuts.

Oakland Raiders
On September 5, 2016, Grant was signed to the Raiders' practice squad. He was released by the Raiders on September 14, 2016.

San Francisco 49ers
On September 21, 2016, Grant was signed to the San Francisco 49ers' practice squad.

New York Giants
On January 12, 2017, Grant signed a reserve/future contract with the Giants. He was waived on September 2, 2017 and was signed to the Giants' practice squad the next day. He was promoted to the active roster on September 18, 2017. He was placed on injured reserve on November 27, 2017 after being carted off with a knee injury in Week 12.

References

External links
Ohio State Buckeyes bio

1992 births
Living people
American football linebackers
Ohio State Buckeyes football players
Players of American football from Richmond, Virginia
San Diego Chargers players
Atlanta Falcons players
Tennessee Titans players
Oakland Raiders players
San Francisco 49ers players
New York Giants players